Kurt Naebig (born 1963/1964) is an American actor who has made various appearances on ER, Prison Break, and made movie roles in Road to Perdition, The Relic, Henry: Portrait of a Serial Killer, and Howard Beach: Making a Case of a Murder. He also did voice acting in video games such as FreeSpace 2, Summoner, Oni, and Red Faction. He has recently worked on Witless Protection and The Express: The Ernie Davis Story.  Kurt Naebig's career also includes voice over work (or voice acting) with Breathe Bible.

Naebig graduated from the Juilliard School, where he was a member of the Drama Division's of Group 19 (1986–1990). He also does many voiceovers in commercials.

Filmography

References

External links
 Official site
 
 

1960s births
American male film actors
American male television actors
American male stage actors
American male voice actors
Juilliard School alumni
Living people
Place of birth missing (living people)